Raam Lalchand Pridhani ( also known as Raam Soraya or Ram Soraya) is an entrepreneur and film producer from Indonesia. He was born in Surabaya, Indonesia, 4 November 1949. He is the owner of production house Soraya Intercine Films.

Before the film industry, he was a textile importer. His career in film began as a distributor for East Java (1972 to 1982). He became a producer in the Budak Nafsu (1983) which won Best Film at the Indonesian Film Festival (FFI) 1984. The movie is the result of his own company, PT. Soraya Intercine Films. After that he made films including Sembilan Wali (1985), Permainan Yang Nakal (1986), Saya Suka Kamu Punya (1987) and others.

Soraya's career peak came after taking over production of the Warkop DKI series from Raam Punjabi's Parkit Film. Soraya made Warkop TV series in 1995 until 2007.

External links

Indonesian businesspeople
Indonesian film producers
Indonesian people of Indian descent
People from Surabaya
Living people
1949 births
Sepuluh Nopember Institute of Technology alumni